The Kpelle syllabary was invented c. 1935 by Chief Gbili of Sanoyie, Liberia. It was intended for writing the Kpelle language, a member of the Mande group of Niger-Congo languages spoken by about 490,000 people in Liberia and around 300,000 people in Guinea at that time.

The syllabary consists of 88 graphemes and is written from left to right in horizontal rows. Many of the glyphs have more than one form.

It was used to some extent by speakers of Kpelle in Liberia and Guinea during the 1930s and early 1940s but never achieved popular acceptance. It has been classed as a failed script.

Today Kpelle is written with a version of the Latin alphabet.

References

Kpelle people
Writing systems of Africa
Writing systems introduced in 1935